Founded in 1991, the International Coalition of Girls' Schools (ICGS) is a non-profit membership association serving Pre-K through 12th-grade single-sex girls’ schools across the globe. Its members are independent, public, charter, and religiously-affiliated schools. ICGS provides various community services including research on the outcomes of girls’ schools, advocacy outreach, professional development opportunities (example: international conferences and regional symposiums) and networking events for educators to connect and collaborate.

Until 2022, ICGS was known as the National Coalition of Girls’ Schools. Over the last decade, the number of countries represented in ICGS has increased by 50 percent. As the Coalition's membership has grown and become more diverse, its reach, influence and scope has expanded. Today, the Coalition is focused intently on providing global value, clearly articulated in its vision statement: "To elevate women's leadership worldwide by educating and empowering students to be ethical, globally minded changemakers." Additionally, ICGS has four broad strategic goals to guide the Coalition's work, including: leading worldwide in girls’ education, promoting best education practices in girls’ schools, advancing girls’ schools, and expanding membership value to our teachers and the students they serve.

History 
In the late 1980s, Rachel Belash (Head of Miss Porter's School (CT) and President of the Coalition of Girls' Boarding Schools) and Arlene Gibson (Head of Kent Place School (NJ) and President of the Coalition of Girls' Day Schools) issued a combined call to action. Their goal: to systematically document the value and benefit of an all-girls education, and to share that information broadly. In 1988 and 1990, two related studies were undertaken in order to provide relevant quantitative research.

In 1990, the research showed that girls' schools were seen as ideal settings for adolescent girls since they supported risk-taking, encouraged academic excellence, prepared girls for college and the real world, and fostered a sense of leadership and self-development. Recent graduates of girls’ schools cited strong preparation for college and personal development as key benefits they received from their all-girls education. One troubling finding was that the general population had a misguided perception that coed schools had stronger programs in math and science.

The quantitative research gave the Coalition of Girls' Boarding Schools and the Coalition of Girls' Day Schools the mandate to be leaders in the national dialogue on girls' and women's issues. Those educators who were experienced with teaching only girls were determined to share the robustly positive picture of the role of girls' schools in American education. The findings of the quantitative research gave administrators in girls' schools important talking points for future marketing and promotional literature, including showcasing the strength of girls' schools in the fields of math and science.

In a push toward collaboration and the power of collective action, 56 independent and religiously-affiliated schools boarding and day schools officially came together to form the National Coalition of Girls' Schools (the “Coalition”).

Study conducted for the Coalition of Girls' Boarding Schools (CGBS) 

In 1987, Rachel Belash contacted heads of girls' boarding schools urging them to collaborate on a market research project to respond to declining enrollments at their schools. A steering committee was formed, and in 1988, the firm Ransome/Maguire was hired to conduct a study. In 600 phone interviews with prospective and current parents of girls' boarding schools across the country, girls' schools were cited for their academic excellence and their ability to provide a communal environment that encouraged personal and academic exploration in a supportive culture. Girls' schools were seen as ideal settings for adolescent girls since they supported risk-taking, encouraged academic excellence, prepared girls for college and the real world, and fostered a sense of leadership and self-development. However, one troubling finding was the perception among many of the respondents that coed schools had stronger programs in math and science. Educators at girls' schools were astonished by this perception, and this finding led CGBS to focus on showcasing the strength of girls' schools in the fields of math and science.

Study conducted for the Coalition of Girls' Day Schools (CGDS) 

In 1989, Arlene Gibson encouraged heads of girls' day schools to convene at that year's Headmistresses Association of the East conference. As a result of the meeting a steering committee was formed which hired in 1990 Yankelovich, Shulman, and Clancy as research consultants. Commissioned by CGDS, the firm surveyed 1,200 girls' school graduates. Half of those surveyed graduated between 1955 and 1960; the others between 1975 and 1980. The study confirmed many of the same conclusions of the CGBS report. Graduates cited strong preparation for college and personal development as key benefits they received from their all-girls education. CGDS used these findings to develop a major media campaign showcasing the positive attitudes of girls' school alumnae.

By researching and promoting the concept of single-gender schooling, the Coalition of Girls' Boarding Schools and the Coalition of Girls' Day Schools became leaders in the national dialogue on girls' and women's issues. Those educators who were experienced with teaching only girls were determined to use the two studies to paint a different picture of the role of girls' schools in American education. The findings of the studies gave administrators in girls' schools important talking points for future marketing and promotional literature.Strengthened by their new data, the CGBS and CGDS leadership realized there was great power in collective action. In November 1991, the steering committees of both organizations met and agreed to merge. Fifty-six independent and religiously-affiliated schools officially came together to form the National Coalition of Girls' Schools. Its first collective undertaking: a comprehensive campaign to heighten the visibility and document the value of the girls' school experience.

Margaret "Meg" Moulton and Whitney "Whitty" Ransome, who had been serving as the Executive Directors of the Coalition of Girls' Boarding Schools since 1989, were asked to stay on as the founding Executive Directors of NCGS.

In the proceeding years, collaboration replaced competition. Research supported belief. The climate and conversation shifted. Moulton and Ransome's collaborative leadership and relentless advocacy on behalf of girls' schools helped set NCGS on the path to success.

1991-2000 
It was believed that public relations and marketing initiatives would be strongest if constructed on a theoretical and pedagogical base for the value of girls' schools. Families would then better appreciate the positive outcomes of a girls' school education. The wealth of scholarship and research about women and girls provided information upon which to base the Coalition's initiatives and programming. Moulton and Ransome quickly understood that an entrepreneurial stance was key to the Coalition's survival.

Public relations became a main priority during the Coalition's first decade. The goal was to both increase public awareness of the benefits of all-girls education for girls and to help individual NCGS member schools with their own public relations efforts. NCGS worked to establish a media presence through published press releases, radio and print interviews, and letters to the editor. These efforts helped position NCGS as an expert on girls' education. In January 1992, when the AAUW released the report, Shortchanging Girls, Shortchanging America, which highlighted key areas of gender inequity in American education, NCGS moved swiftly to position itself in response to the findings. The timing allowed for the Coalition's recently gathered research and data in support of girls' schools to become part of the national conversation about gender issues, which was going full tilt.

From its founding, NCGS actively sought to provide its members with valuable professional development experiences, particularly in the areas of math and science. Driven by the finding in the CGBS study that many parents perceived girls' schools to be weak in math and science, Ann Pollina at Westover School (CT) who was Dean of Faculty and Chair of the Math Department at the time and math teacher Louise Gould at Ethel Walker School (CT) organized a Math and Science Symposium at Wellesley College in June 1991. These educators wanted to share their best practices with the general public and believed girls' schools were an ideal setting to help girls succeed and close the gender gap in STEM fields. The first three of many NCGS publications flowed from the successful Symposium: The Executive Summary, Task Force Reports, and The Complete Proceedings. NCGS received extensive media coverage from the release of these publications. Following the success of the first Symposium, NCGS hosted a Girls in the Physical Sciences Symposium in partnership with the Dudley Wright Center at Tufts University in Boston in 1993 and then a Girls and Technology Conference at Wellesley in 1995. NCGS received a grant from the National Science Foundation to create three publications highlighting the sessions and best practices exchanged at the 1995 conference. The success of these conferences led NCGS to take the Girls and Technology Conference to San Francisco in 1997 marking the Coalition's first-ever programming on the West Coast. These professional development opportunities and the publications that flowed from them helped establish NCGS as a thought-leader on STEM education for girls.

This first decade of robust, innovative programming and initiatives set the stage for a future of healthy growth for both NCGS and its member schools. The organization was also forward-thinking from the outset by expanding membership to public and international schools during its first two years. The two remaining all-girls public schools in the country became involved with NCGS in its first year, and in January 1993, affiliate membership was established for international girls' schools. An impressive total of 41 Canadian and Australian girls' schools immediately took advantage of this opportunity. Moulton and Ransome continued to strengthen these international connections and spoke at the 1995 Girls' School Association conference in London.

Within a decade, girls' schools were enjoying a renaissance. Increasing numbers of parents, students, educators, and policy-makers came to recognize the benefits of girl-centered education. The number of NCGS schools at their enrollment capacity doubled from 1991 to 1995, and there was a 31% increase in inquiries at girls' schools since the founding of NCGS. Perhaps the most compelling proof was the rapid emergence of new, independent, and public all-girl educational settings. In just the last half of the 1990s, 16 states offered new all-girls classes and 32 new all-girl schools were founded in cities coast to coast.

2000-2008 
As the Coalition approached its 10th anniversary, girls' schools continued to experience growth and strength. Enrollment at girls' schools was up nearly 40% since 1991, and nearly 70% of NCGS member schools were at full capacity. NCGS continued to expand its membership, advocate for girl-centered education in the media, and provide girls' schools around the world with quality professional development and networking opportunities.

This decade also saw a renewed focus on research on girls' schools. In 1999, NCGS hired Goodman Research Group to collect and analyze data about the all-girls experience from the perspective of graduates of girls' schools as compared to female peers at coed schools. Over 4,000 graduates were surveyed, and the responses affirmed the benefits of girls' schools. The findings helped shape marketing and public relations materials in the early 2000s. In March 2009, Dr. Linda Sax at UCLA published her research, Women Graduates of Single-Sex and Coeducational High Schools: Differences in their Characteristics and the Transition to College, which was commissioned by NCGS. The report documented the statistically significant edge girls' school graduates have over their coed peers in many areas including self-confidence, life goals, STEM interest, and career orientation.

NCGS continued to convene regional and national professional development opportunities for member schools. In 1999, the Board of Trustees identified financial literacy as a key area of programming for NCGS. The Board saw this topic as critical for gender equality in the 21st century, so NCGS created a series of programs to address financial literacy and empowerment for girls. In 2000, NCGS hosted the Women, Girls, and Money Conference in Boston. The success of the conference led to a series of publications highlighting research on the financial gender gap, tips for parents on raising financially savvy daughters, and best practices for incorporating financial literacy into the curriculum at schools. NCGS expanded the program by hosting a series of regional financial literacy seminars across the country. These, along with the financial literacy initiatives at individual member schools, helped attract extensive media attention, including articles in The New York Times, The Boston Globe, and The San Francisco Chronicle, and a television interview on ABC News.

In addition to financial literacy, NCGS kept its focus on math and science by hosting and promoting regional STEM workshops and think tanks during the early 2000s. Global education also remained a priority. NCGS partnered with the Girls' Schools Association to host an international conference in London in 2006, and "Global Citizenship" was the theme of the Coalition's 2007 annual conference. Each year NCGS invited student representatives from around the world to participate in a forum and discussion during the annual conference, demonstrating its commitment to expanding global networks and opportunities for girls.

2009-2012 
As NCGS approached its 20th anniversary, Ransome and Moulton retired successively in 2008 and 2009, and the Board of Trustees faced the challenge of leading the organization through its first significant leadership transition. Their commitment to the NCGS mission and enterprising mindset had established NCGS as a well-respected advocate for girls' schools, and the Board sought a leader to carry on their legacy. Armed with a commitment to using this time to secure the foundations of the Coalition and ensure financial sustainability, the Board assessed all areas of the organization with the goal of establishing policies and practices that would attract the new leader they sought.

So much had changed in twenty years: new girls' public, charter, and independent schools had opened, most notably the Young Women's Leadership Network (YWLN) schools in New York; schools were now conducting their own research and holding collaborative think tanks; the Online School for Girls was creating a new platform for education and professional development; communications had shifted to social media; and the case for the education of girls had become a global priority. So how would NCGS adapt with this new and much-improved landscape for girls' schools in the U.S.?

Over the course of a three-year transition that included the executive leadership of Susanne Beck (2009-2011) followed by the interim leadership of Burch Ford, Former NCGS Board Chair (2000-2003) and retired Head of Miss Porter's School, as President (3/2011-7/2012) and Nancy Mugele as Interim Executive Director (7/2011-6/2012), the Coalition began to set its course for the future. During this time, NCGS expanded its Board to include heads of girls' public and international schools. The Board also underwent a strategic review and planning process to create a vision statement and re-craft the original NCGS mission, which was extended from awareness to advocacy. The first National Conference on Girls' Education in February 2012 in Washington, DC, a joint undertaking by NCGS and YWLN, affirmed the Coalition's position at the forefront of thought leadership on girls' education.

After an extensive search, the NCGS Board of Trustees announced the selection of Megan Murphy as the next Executive Director beginning July 1, 2012. Megan was charged with the ongoing implementation of the NCGS 2013 Strategic Way Forward goals: to establish NCGS and its member schools as thought-leaders in educating girls, to build a financially robust model for fulfilling the NCGS mission, and to deepen relationships and collaboration with member schools in order to engage, inspire, and sustain membership.

The Coalition continued to provide and expand its robust resources and opportunities in the areas of research, professional development, advocacy, and networking.

NCGS stayed committed to advancing research on all-girls education, releasing Steeped in Learning: The Student Experience at All-Girls Schools in 2015, an analysis of data collected via the High School Survey of Student Engagement (HSSSE). Administered by Indiana University's Center for Evaluation & Education Policy (CEEP), HSSSE explores facets of student's attitudes, behaviors, and school experiences that are known to affect learning. This report compared the experience of girls at all-girls schools with those of girls enrolled in coed institutions. The girls' responses provided unequivocal support for the value of an all-girls educational environment, especially in the areas of academic engagement and readiness for college and the real world.

ICGS offers professional development for educators of girls, hosting regional, national, international, and online conferences and forums. The first-ever Global Forum on Girls' Education, Creating a World of Possibilities, was held in New York City in February 2016. NCGS hosted this ground-breaking conference in partnership with 13 preeminent educational organizations from around the world, including the UK, Australia, Canada, South Africa, and The Philippines. The Global Forum brought together 950 educators, researchers, advocates, and authors from 23 countries. Gloria Steinem and Arianna Huffington were among the keynote speakers. The Global Forum on Girls' Education II was held in Washington, DC in June 2018, which included keynote appearances from Billie Jean King, Azar Nafisi, Halla Tómasdóttir, Sylvia Acevedo, and Lieutenant Colonel Lucy Giles, Gail Kelly.

ICGS Today

Since 2015, the Coalition's Board has held in-depth discussions and assembled various task forces on a wide variety of opportunities and challenges facing girls’ schools. The first-ever Global Forum on Girls' Education, was held in New York City in February 2016. The Forum hosted nearly 2,000 delegates at this ground-breaking conference, in partnership with 13 preeminent educational organizations from around the world, including the UK, Australia, Canada, South Africa, and The Philippines.. Gloria Steinem and Arianna Huffington were among the keynote speakers.

The Global Forum on Girls' Education II was held in Washington, DC in June 2018, which included keynote appearances from Billie Jean King, Azar Nafisi, Halla Tómasdóttir, Sylvia Acevedo, and Lieutenant Colonel Lucy Giles, Gail Kelly.

The Global Forum on Girls’ Education III was held in Boston in June 2022, and included keynote appearances from Paula A. Johnson, Leymah Gbowee, Shabana Basij-Rasikh, Lisa Damour, Antigone Davis, Ziauddun Yousafzai, and Dr. Amineh Hoti.

At the Global Forum III, the Coalition officially replaced “National” with “International” in its name in order to be more inclusionary and represent its current membership, programs, and future.

Member Schools 
The International Coalition of Girls' Schools serves more than 500 national and international Pre-K through 12th-grade girls' schools (independent, public, charter, and religiously-affiliated). In 2022, ICGS merged with The U.K.-based Association of State Girls’ Schools, the European Association of Single-Sex Education. A merger with the Alliance of Girls’ Schools Australasia will become official in January 2024.

Notable girls' school alumnae 
 Anne Archer, Academy Award-nominated actress, Marlborough School (Los Angeles, California)
 Aidy Bryant, actress and Saturday Night Live cast member, Xavier College Preparatory (Phoenix, Arizona)
 Tracy Caulkins, three-time Olympic gold medal-winning swimmer, Harpeth Hall (Nashville, Tennessee)
 Annie Dillard, Pulitzer Prize-winning author, The Ellis School (Pittsburgh, Pennsylvania)
 Ava DuVernay, director and screenwriter, Saint Joseph High School (Lakewood, California)
 Veronica Escobar, U.S. House of Representatives-TX, Loretto Academy (El Paso, Texas)
 Gloria Estefan, Grammy Award-winning singer/songwriter, Our Lady of Lourdes Academy (Miami, Florida)
 Dianne Feinstein, U.S. Senator from California, Convent of the Sacred Heart High School for Girls (San Francisco, California)
 Geraldine Ferraro, first woman to run for Vice President of the U.S., Marymount School (New York, New York)
 Jane Fonda, two-time Academy Award-winning actress, political activist, Emma Willard School (Troy, New York)
 Adena Friedman, Nasdaq CEO and President, Roland Park Country Day (Baltimore, Maryland)
 Melinda Gates, philanthropist, Ursuline Academy of Dallas (Dallas, Texas)
 Greta Gerwig, Academy Award-nominated director and actress, St. Francis High School, (Sacramento, California)
 Kirsten Gillibrand, U.S. Senator from New York, Emma Willard School (Troy, New York)
 Amy Grant, GRAMMY and Dove award-winning singer-songwriter, Harpeth Hall (Nashville, Tennessee)
 Margaret Hamilton, actress, Hathaway Brown School (Shaker Heights, Ohio)
 Marilyn P. Johnson, 8th U.S. Ambassador to Togo, The Woodward School (Quincy, Massachusetts)
 Jacqueline Kennedy Onassis, First Lady of the U.S., author, Chapin School (New York, NY) and Miss Porter's School (Farmington, Connecticut)
 Sallie Krawcheck, CEO and Co-Founder, Ellevest and former CEO, Smith Barney, Ashley Hall (Charleston, South Carolina)
 Christine Lagarde, French lawyer and Managing Director for the International Monetary Fund, Holton-Arms School (Bethesda, Maryland)
 Christina Lamb, author and foreign correspondent, NonsuchHigh School for Girls (Surrey, UK)
 Mary Landrieu, U.S. Senator from Louisiana, Ursuline Academy (New Orleans, Louisiana)
 Katie Ledecky, five-time Olympic gold medalist and nine-time World Champion swimmer, Stone Ridge School of the Sacred Heart (Bethesda, Maryland)
 Téa Leoni, actress and producer, Brearley School (New York, New York)
 Marne Levine, COO of Instagram, Laurel School (Shaker Heights, Ohio)
 Lisa Loeb, Grammy award-winning singer-songwriter and actress, The Hockaday School (Dallas, Texas)
 Julia Louis-Dreyfus, actress, Holton-Arms School (Bethesda, Maryland)
 Meghan Markle, actress and UN Women advocate, Immaculate Heart High School (Los Angeles, California)
 Barbara Mikulski, U.S. Senator from Maryland, Institute of Notre Dame (Baltimore, Maryland)
 Katherine "Kate" Mulleavy and Laura Mulleavy, founders of the fashion label Rodarte, Alverno Heights Academy (Sierra Madre, California)
 Susan O'Day, EVP and CIO, Walt Disney Company, Miss Hall's School (Pittsfield, Massachusetts)
 Gwyneth Paltrow, Academy Award-winning actress, Spence School (New York, New York)
 Minnie Pearl, comedian, Harpeth Hall (Nashville, Tennessee)
 Nancy Pelosi, U.S. Senator from California, only women to serve as Speaker of the House (2007-2011), Minority Leader of the U.S. House of Representatives, Institute of Notre Dame (Baltimore, Maryland)
 Condoleezza Rice, Secretary of State, St. Mary's Academy (Englewood, Colorado)
 Susan Rice, U.S. National Security Advisor, U.S. Ambassador to the United Nations, National Cathedral School (Washington, DC)
 Cokie Roberts, NPR journalist, Stone Ridge School of the Sacred Heart (Bethesda, Maryland)
 Maria Shriver, author, journalist, former First Lady of California, Stone Ridge School of the Sacred Heart (Bethesda, Maryland)
 Elissa Slotkin, U.S. Representative for Michigan, Cranbrook Schools (Bloomfield Hills, Michigan)
 Elizabeth Cady Stanton, leading figure of the early women's rights movement, Troy Female Seminary [now Emma Willard School] (Troy, New York)
 Meredith Vieira, journalist/talk show host known for The View and Today, Lincoln School (Providence, Rhode Island)
 Melissa Villaseñor, actress and Saturday Night Live cast member, Ramona Convent Secondary School (Alhambra, California)
 Abby Wambach, two-time Olympic gold medalist, FIFA Women's World Cup champion, and U.S. Women's National Team soccer player, Our Lady of Mercy High School (Rochester, New York)
 Kerry Washington, BET Award-winning actress, Spence School (New York, New York)
 Sigourney Weaver, Golden Globes Award-winning and Academy Award-nominated actress, Chapin School (New York, New York)
 Christine Todd Whitman, former Governor of New Jersey, Chapin School (New York, New York)
 Reese Witherspoon, Academy Award and Golden Globes Award-winning actress, Harpeth Hall (Nashville, Tennessee)

References

External links
 National Coalition of Girls' Schools

Girls' schools in the United States
Private and independent school organizations in the United States